The Twin Girls (Spanish: Las gemelas) is a 1963 Spanish musical film directed by Antonio del Amo and starring Maleni Castro, José Bódalo and Helga Liné.

The film's sets were designed by Sigfrido Burmann.

Cast

References

Bibliography 
 de España, Rafael. Directory of Spanish and Portuguese film-makers and films. Greenwood Press, 1994.

External links 
 

1963 films
Spanish musical films
1960s Spanish-language films
Films directed by Antonio del Amo
Twins in fiction
1960s Spanish films